Mariano Bíttolo (born 24 April 1990) is an Argentine professional footballer who plays as a left-back for Argentinos Juniors.

Career
Bíttolo started his career at the age of 18 in Vélez Sársfield and since 2013 he played for Colón. After the loss of signing Kostas Giannoulis from Olympiakos, Atromitos decided to sign a two years' contract with Bíttolo.

On 28 October 2017, Bíttolo suffered a gruesome injury that required 10 stitches to his genital area after being struck by the studs of his teammate.

On 27 July 2018, Bíttolo returned to his homeland to sign for Newell's Old Boys on a one-year loan deal with a charge of $25,000 and a option to make the deal permanent. A year later, the loan deal was extended for one further year. in July 2020, Newell's triggered the option and signed Bíttolo on a deal until the end of 2023.

On 24 January 2022, Bíttolo joined fellow league club Argentinos Juniors on a deal until the end of 2023.

Honours
Vélez Sársfield
 Argentine Primera División: 2009 Clausura, 2011 Clausura, 2012 Inicial

References

External links

Living people
1990 births
Argentine people of Italian descent
Argentine footballers
Association football defenders
Argentine Primera División players
Segunda División players
Club Atlético Vélez Sarsfield footballers
Club Atlético Colón footballers
Super League Greece players
Atromitos F.C. players
Córdoba CF players
Albacete Balompié players
Newell's Old Boys footballers
Argentinos Juniors footballers
Argentine expatriate footballers
Argentine expatriate sportspeople in Greece
Argentine expatriate sportspeople in Spain
Expatriate footballers in Greece
Expatriate footballers in Spain
People from Morón Partido
Sportspeople from Buenos Aires Province